Alphazone is a German hard trance group from Braunschweig, comprising Alex Zwarg and Arne Reichelt. The group was formed in 1995. In 1996 they released their first single - "Overload". In 2001 they became popular with their remix of DJ Kim's "Jetlag" track and in the following years they released several successful singles.

Aliases: Overload, Saturator, Saltwater, D-Mention, Pump Machine, Nightflight, Nebulus, Geoffrey Whiteman, Aramanja, Bias Bros., Crusader.

Discography
1998 Fuzzcinating / X-Ray (as Overload)
1998 Fanatic / Sunrise (as Saturator)
1999 Dreamland (as D-Mention)
2000 Mind Driver (as D-Mention)
2001 Daydream (as D-Mention)
2002 Stay
2003 Rockin'
2004 Flashback

2004 Desire (as Nightflight)
2004 Destination Paradise (as Nebulus)
2005 Sunrise
2006 My House is Your House (as Crusader)
2007 Forever

Remixes
 Aramanja - Memories (Alphazone Sunset Mix)
 Atmosphere - Storm (Alphazone Remix)
 Bas & Ram - Speed of Light (Geoffrey Whiteman Remix)
 BK - Revolution (Alphazone Remix)
 Bossanova - Stonecold (Alphazone Rocktrance Remix)
 Callisto - Ways (Geoffrey Whiteman Remix)
 Dave Joy - Second Chase (Alphazone Remix)
 Cloudchaser - Aerodynamic (Alphazone Remix)
 Digital Pressure - Aftershock (Alphazone Remix)
 DJ Kim - Jetlag (Alphazone Remix)
 DJ Kim - Time and Space (Alphazone Remix)
 DJ Kim - Get Ready to Explode (Alphazone Remix)
 DJ Ozawa - DNA 02 (Alphazone Remix)
 DJ U Hey vs. DJ Minagawa - Survivor (Alphazone Remix)
 DuMonde - Ich Will Raus (Alphazone Vs Ralph Novell German Mix)
 DuMonde - Let Me Out (Alphazone Vs Ralph Novell English Mix)
 Escade - Shuffle Royale (Alphazone Remix)
 Euphonic - Far and Away (Alphazone Remix)
 Evil Angel ft. Kym Marsh - Today (Alphazone Dub Mix)
 Evil Angel ft. Kym Marsh - Today (Alphazone Vox Mix)
 Fragrance - Don't Break My Heart (Alphazone Rmx)
 Fragrance - Don't Break My Heart (Nebulus Rmx)
 Hardy Hard - Silver Surfer (Unofficial Alphazone Remix)
 Ian Van Dahl - Try (Alphazone Remix)
 JS Ten - Spiritualized (Basswizzards Remix)
 Kira - I'll Be Your Angel (Alphazone Remix)
 Lay-D-Jay - Daywalker (Pump Machine Remix)
 Mat Silver vs. Tony Burt - Ultimate Wave (Alphazone Remix)
 Micro Tools - Triomphe De L'Amour (Alphazone Remix)
 Nish - Sagittarius (Alphazone Remix)
 Ralph Novell - Wrong Love (Alphazone Remix)
 Saltwater - The Legacy (Alphazone Remix)
 Saltwater - Serenity (Alphazone Remix)
 Saltwater - Strange (Alphazone Remix)
 Steve Hill & Nervous - We are Alive (Alphazone Remix)
 Tom Porcell - Not Tonite (Bias Bros. Remix)
 Tomonari And Tommy Pi - C Sharp 2005 (Alphazone Remix)
 Vandall - Can't Explain (Alphazone Remix)

External links
 Alphazone Official Site and Record Label
 Visit Alphazone on Myspace!
 Alphazone on Discogs

German trance music groups
German electronic music groups